Adam Shaw (born 1957) is an American painter. Shaw's work has been widely exhibited in the United States and is featured in hundreds of private and corporate collections throughout the United States, Canada, Mexico, and Europe, including Bank of America's, Gap's, Marriot's and eBay's.

Life and work
Adam Shaw was born in New York City. He has been painting his entire life and began working with oils in the mid-1970s. He was educated in the Renaissance tradition, receiving a BA in Classics, with a minor in Russian and Italian. In 1979 and 1980 he lived in Italy, in Florence and Urbino, studying art history. In 1981 he moved to San Francisco to pursue a master's degree in Poetics. Following that he became a physician and was in private practice for 14 years. He has taught workshops and lectured at numerous institutions, including Palmer College and the College of Marin. He has published a number of his own poems and has translated poetry from Latin, Russian and Italian.

His work combines abstract tradition with a sensibility to the present moment that is the result of an affinity for Eastern spiritual teachings.  His paintings have lush surfaces built up over the course of 3 to 5 years or more, and a luminous tension that evokes a deep emotional response in the viewer.

Process

In his early career, Shaw would often work on a single piece over many months, spending hours “just looking” interspersed with outbursts of painterly activity.  At the time he was generally regarded as a “color field” painter. However, in the 1990s and beyond he became preoccupied with dense textural surfaces and his work habits evolved to exploring the development of an entire body of work simultaneously, with as many as 20 paintings in varying degrees of process. In creating his paintings he uses brushes, sticks, rags, pouring, sanding, grinding, scraping, etc., working both on the easel and the floor inside his studio in the Sonoma wine country north of San Francisco, as well as outside where his paintings often bake in the sun.

He will frequently work on a painting for an entire day, later to completely scrape off all the paint that was applied, leaving only remnants of the paint that found its way into previously gouged out areas.  He works like this over the course of years to build a single painting, with its layers mostly never seen by the viewer though they impart a sense of history. Throughout the process the use of language — written, painted, or scraped into the paint — is actively employed, expressing poetic, philosophical and personal messages, most of which get covered over or remain as fragmentary relics.

His work expands the tradition of abstraction by reliance on classical painterly techniques and a view towards the referential.  He has explored numerous directions loosely referred to as landscape, flowers, trees, and work using language as an element.

Adam Shaw's process involves the application and removal often of well over one hundred layers on a single painting, which may take over a decade to make, creating lush textural surfaces that retain a remarkable luminosity.  His work is informed by lifelong study of esoteric western and eastern traditions evoking transformative spiritual experience.

Gallery
The following images show representative work from four categories of Adam Shaw paintings.

Landscapes

Trees

Flowers 
{|
| 
| [[File:Near Shore Creates the Far, 66x60 by Adam Shaw.jpg|thumb|upright|Adam Shaw, Near Shore Creates the Far", 66x60]]
| 
| 
|}

 Language 

From Shaw's website.

Public collections
 Bank of America Building, San Francisco, CA
 Gap Corporate Offices, San Francisco, CA
 Los Alamos National Bank, Santa Fe, NM
 Marriott Hotel, San Francisco, CA
 3 Com Corporation, San Jose, CA
 Industrial Indemnity, San Francisco, CA
 Quantum Corporation, Santa Clara, CA
 Magley and Associates, San Francisco, CA
 Silicon Valley Bank, San Jose, CA
 Asante Partners, Menlo Park, CA
 Motion Picture Actors of America Association, Woodland Hills, CA
 eBay Corporation, San Jose, CA
 St. Francis Hospital Foundation, San Francisco, CA
 Cushman Wakefield, San Francisco, CA
 Shorenstein Realty, San Francisco, CA
 San Francisco Bay Club, San Francisco, CA

References

 Focus Santa Fe Magazine June/July 2005; "Converging Influences", pp 86, 87
 THE Magazine'' June 2006; page 38

External links 
 Official Adam Shaw site

1957 births
Living people
Abstract painters
American contemporary painters
Painters from New York City
Painters from California
20th-century American painters
American male painters
20th-century American male artists